His Best Friend may refer to:

 His Best Friend (1918 film), a German silent film directed by Uwe Jens Krafft 
 His Best Friend (1929 film), a German silent film directed by Harry Piel
 His Best Friend (1937 film), a German film remake, also directed by Piel
 His Best Friend (1962 film), a West German film directed by Luis Trenker